MFK Baník Veľký Krtíš is a Slovak football team, based in the town of Veľký Krtíš.

External links 
at ssfz.sk

References

Football clubs in Slovakia